Lewis Francis Scholes Sr., known as Lou Scholes (15 June 1880 – 19 April 1942), was a Canadian rower. He competed in the men's single sculls event at the 1908 Summer Olympics.

References

External links
 

1880 births
1942 deaths
Canadian male rowers
Olympic rowers of Canada
Rowers at the 1908 Summer Olympics
Rowers from Toronto